The 1991 Tulsa Golden Hurricane football team represented the University of Tulsa during the 1991 NCAA Division I-A football season. In their fourth year under head coach David Rader, the Golden Hurricane compiled a 10–2 record and defeated San Diego State, 28–17, in the 1991 Freedom Bowl. During the regular season, the team defeated #15 Texas A&M (35-34) and lost to #2 Miami (10-34).

The team's statistical leaders included quarterback T. J. Rubley with 2,054 passing yards, Chris Hughley with 1,326 rushing yards, and Chris Penn with 792 receiving yards.

Schedule

Roster

Rankings

References

Tulsa
Tulsa Golden Hurricane football seasons
Freedom Bowl champion seasons
Tulsa Golden Hurricane football